The Deadlys Awards was an annual celebration of Australian Aboriginal and Torres Strait Islander achievement in music, sport, entertainment and community.

Music
Most Promising New Talent: Lez Beckett
Single Release of the Year: Casey Donovan — Listen with Your Heart
Album Release of the Year: Fitzroy Xpress — Home Sweet Home
Band of the Year: Local Knowledge
Artist of the Year: Casey Donovan
Jimmy Little Award for Lifetime Achievement in Aboriginal and Torres Strait Islander Music: Kev Carmody
Excellence in Film or Theatrical Score: Mary G & The G Spot Band — The Mary G Show

Sport
Most Promising New Talent: Brenton Bowen
Outstanding Achievement in AFL: Michael O'Loughlin
Outstanding Achievement In rugby league: Matt Bowen
Female Sportsperson of the Year: Stacey Porter
Male Sportsperson of the Year: Matt Bowen
The Ella Award For Lifetime Achievement in Aboriginal and Torres Strait Islander Sport: Lionel Rose

The arts
Dancer of the Year: Rayma Johnson
Outstanding Achievement in Film and Television: Wayne Blair, Director — The Djarn Djarns
Outstanding Achievement in Literature: Stephen Hagan — The N Word: One Man's Stand 
Actor of the Year: Leah Purcell — Stuff Happens
Visual Artists of the Year: Gordon Hooke
Special Presentation Lifetime Achievement Award: Justine Saunders Oa

Community
DEST Award For Outstanding Achievement in Aboriginal and Torres Strait Islander Education: Peter Buckskin
Outstanding Achievement in Aboriginal and Torres Strait Islander Health: Sandra Eades
Broadcaster of the Year: Rhoda Roberts — Deadly Sounds And Awaye!, Australian Broadcasting Commission Radio
New Apprentice of the Year: Andrew Craig

External links
 Deadlys 2005 winners at Vibe 

The Deadly Awards
2005 in Australian music
Indigenous Australia-related lists